NR Seetharam Prabhu (born 25 August 1964) is an Indian cricket umpire. He has officiated 28 First-class matches and 18 List A matches. He made his debut as an umpire in major domestic cricket on 12 November 1999 in a one-day match between Haryana and Himachal Pradesh.

References 

1964 births
Indian cricket umpires
Living people